Carl Waaler Kaas (born 28 July 1982) is a Norwegian orienteering competitor, and medal winner from both World Orienteering Championships and European Orienteering Championships.

Waaler Kaas won the middle distance event in the World Orienteering Championships in 2010 in Trondheim, Norway. Later same week he won silver in the relay event together with Audun Weltzien and Olav Lundanes.

He received a bronze medal in the relay event at the European Orienteering Championships in 2006 in Otepää, together with Lars Skjeset and Øystein Kvaal Østerbø. He finished 14th in the sprint event.

His first appearance in the World Championships was in Olomouc in 2008, where he finished 11th in the long course.

He now represents the club Bækkelagets SK. His previous clubs include: Heming-Njård, IL Tyrving and NTNUI in Trondheim.

References

External links

 

1982 births
Living people
Sportspeople from Oslo
Norwegian orienteers
Male orienteers
Foot orienteers
World Orienteering Championships medalists
20th-century Norwegian people
21st-century Norwegian people